Parmouti (Parmoute), also known as Pharmouthi (Pharmouthí) and Barmudah, is the eighth month of the ancient Egyptian and Coptic calendars. It lasts between April 9 and May 8 of the Gregorian calendar. It was also the fourth month of the Season of the Emergence, when the Nile floods receded and the crops started to grow throughout the land.

Name
The Coptic name Paremoude derives from the Egyptian Renenutet.

Coptic Synaxarium of the month of Parmouti

References

Citations

Bibliography
 Synaxarium of the month of Bermouda

Months of the Coptic calendar
Egyptian calendar